The 2010–11 Gold Coast United season was Gold Coast United's second season in the A-League. They finished the regular season in third place, and were defeated by Central Coast Mariners in the Preliminary Final.

Transfers

In

Out

Loans in

Trial

Released

Squad

Competitions

A-League

League table

Results summary

Results by matchday

Results

A-League Finals

Squad statistics

Appearances and goals

|-
|colspan="14"|Players who left Gold Coast United during the season:
|}

Goal scorers

Disciplinary record

Notes

References

External links
Official website 

Gold Coast United FC seasons
2010–11 A-League season by team